Porlock may refer to:

 Porlock, a coastal village in Somerset
 A character in The Valley of Fear, a Sherlock Holmes novel by Sir Arthur Conan Doyle
 Porlock Bay, on the Bristol Channel
 Porlock Bay, Papua New Guinea
 Porlock Hill
 Porlock Ridge and Saltmarsh

See also
 Person from Porlock